Notre Dame Seminary is a Catholic seminary in New Orleans, Louisiana. It operates under the auspices of the Archdiocese of New Orleans.

It serves the other six Catholic dioceses of the Ecclesiastical Province of New Orleans, six additional dioceses in the Southern United States and Africa, and four Catholic religious institutes. It offers the graduate degrees of M.Div. and M.A. in theological studies.

In 2016, the reported enrollment was around 130 seminarians.

History 
The seminary was founded in 1923 and the building was designed by architect General Allison Owen.

The seminary hosts a bronze copy of Ivan Meštrović's statue Christ and the Samaritan Woman which was exhibited at the Vatican pavilion at the 1984 Louisiana World Exposition. It was installed in front of Shaw Hall and dedicated in 1989 by Archbishop Philip Hannan.

In February 2013, it played host to an exhibit featuring pieces from other institutions (such as the Vatican Collections and the Pope John Paul II Center in Krakow, Poland), about Pope John Paul II, called, "I Have Come To See You Again."; it began its U.S. tour at NDS.

In Spring 2021, the seminary hosted a replica of the Angels Unawares statue, which was initially exhibited at the Catholic University of America and was to return there permanently after its tour.

Notable people

Alumni 

 Servant of God Father Joseph Verbis Lafleur.
 Sister Lory Schaff, a leader in adult literacy education

References

External links
 Official website

Roman Catholic Archdiocese of New Orleans
Universities and colleges in New Orleans
Seminaries and theological colleges in Louisiana
Educational institutions established in 1923
Universities and colleges accredited by the Southern Association of Colleges and Schools
Catholic seminaries in the United States
Catholic universities and colleges in Louisiana
1923 establishments in Louisiana